Triathlon at the 2010 Summer Youth Olympics in Singapore took place at East Coast Park. There were competitions on August 15, 16 and 19.

Rules

Individuals
750M Swim in Open Water
3 lap cycling (20 km)
2 lap run (5 km)

4x Mixed relay
250m Swim in Open Water
7 km cycle race (one lap)
1.7 km run (one lap)

Schedule

Qualified Athletes

Boys

Girls

Medal summary

Medal table

Events

References

External links
Boys' Start List
Girls' Start List

 
2010 Summer Youth Olympics events
Youth Summer Olympics
2010
Triathlon in Singapore